Three ships of the French Navy have borne the name Ambitieux ("ambitious"):
 , a 96-gun ship of the line burnt at La Hougue in June 1692
 , a 96-gun ship of the line
  (1834), a brig

French Navy ship names